Prpić is a Croatian surname.

It is the second most common surname in the Lika-Senj County of Croatia.

People with the name include:

 Filip Prpic (born 1982), Swedish tennis player of Croatian descent
 Goran Prpić (born 1964), Croatian tennis coach and player
 Ivan Prpić (disambiguation), multiple people
 Joel Prpic (born 1974), Canadian-born Croatian ice hockey player
 Marin Prpić (born 1976), Croatian football player

In the English-speaking world, it can be found as anglicized Perpich.

References

Croatian surnames